Loni Peristere is an American television director, producer, and former visual effects supervisor.

He is well known for his work on the Cinemax drama Banshee; and for the FX anthology series American Horror Story.

Career 
He began his career as a visual effects coordinator for the 1997 Tommy Lee Jones starrer Volcano. He worked in the department on future films, such as Cinderella, Serenity, Beyond, and One Day Like Rain. He worked in special effects for TV series Buffy the Vampire Slayer, Angel, Firefly (for which he won an emmy), and Drive.

In 2014, Peristere segued into direction. Helming and producing multiple episodes of Cinemax's Banshee. That same year he began directing for FX's American Horror Story.

He is the co-founder of visual effects studio Zoic Studios.

Filmography

Direction

References

External links 

American film directors
American television directors
Living people
1971 births